The Medal "For the Defence of Stalingrad" was a World War II campaign medal of the Soviet Union.

Medal history 
The Medal "For the Defence of Stalingrad" was established on December 22, 1942 by decree of the Presidium of the Supreme Soviet of the USSR.  The medal's statute was amended on July 18, 1980 by decree of the Presidium of the Supreme Soviet of the USSR № 2523-X.

Medal statute 
The Medal "For the Defence of Stalingrad" was awarded to all participants in the defence of Stalingrad—soldiers of the Red Army, Navy and troops of the NKVD, as well as persons from the civilian population who took part in the defence of Stalingrad during its siege by Axis forces.

Award of the medal was made on behalf of the Presidium of the Supreme Soviet of the USSR on the basis of documents attesting to actual participation in the defence of Stalingrad issued by the unit commander, the chief of the military medical establishment or by a relevant provincial or municipal authority.  Serving military personnel received the medal from their unit commander, retirees from military service received the medal from a regional, municipal or district military commissioner in the recipient's community, members of the civilian population, participants in the defence of Stalingrad received their medal from regional or city Councils of People's Deputies.

The Medal "For the Defence of Stalingrad" was worn on the left side of the chest and in the presence of other awards of the USSR, was located immediately after the Medal "For the Defence of Sevastopol".  If worn in the presence of Orders or medals of the Russian Federation, the latter have precedence.

Medal description 
The Medal "For the Defence of Stalingrad" was a 32mm in diameter circular brass medal with a raised rim.  On its obverse, a row of five overlapping fully equipped soldiers with their rifles at the ready marching to the left, above the two rightmost soldiers, the Soviet flag waving; above the others, tanks and combat aircraft also pointing to the left.  At the top in the center, a relief five pointed star, on either side of the star along the upper medal circumference, the relief inscription "FOR THE DEFENSE OF STALINGRAD".  On the reverse near the top, the relief image of the hammer and sickle, below the image, the relief inscription in three rows "FOR OUR SOVIET MOTHERLAND".

The Medal "For the Defence of Stalingrad" was secured by a ring through the medal suspension loop to a standard Soviet pentagonal mount covered by a 24mm wide olive green silk moiré ribbon with a 2mm central red stripe.

Recipients (partial list) 
The individuals below were all recipients of the Medal "For the Defence of Stalingrad".

Battle of Stalingrad sniper Vasily Grigoryevich Zaytsev
Hero of the Soviet Union earned at Stalingrad Colonel General Aleksandr Ilich Rodimtsev
Order of Suvorov earned at Stalingrad, Lieutenant General Vasily Mikhaylovich Badanov
Sapper Vladimir Fedorovich Chekalov
Combat pilot Captain Mariya Ivanivna Dolina
Marshal of Aviation Fedor Yakovlevich Falaleyev
Designer of artillery and rocket systems, Hero of Socialist Labour, Georgy Ivanovich Sergeev
Marshal of Artillery Vasily Ivanovich Kazakov
Army General Mikhail Sergeevich Malinin
Marshal of Aviation Serhi Gnatovich Rudenko
Major Gabriel Ilyich Urazovsky
War correspondent Pyotr Andreyevich Pavlenko
Army General Semion Pavlovich Ivanov
Marshal of the Soviet Union Georgy Konstantinovich Zhukov
Marshal of the Soviet Union Semyon Konstantinovich Timoshenko
Marshal of the Soviet Union Vasily Ivanovich Chuikov
Marshal of the Soviet Union Aleksandr Mikhaylovich Vasilevsky
Marshal of the Soviet Union Ivan Ignatyevich Yakubovsky
Marshal of the Soviet Union Fyodor Ivanovich Tolbukhin
Marshal of the Soviet Union Sergey Semyonovich Biryuzov
Marshal of the Soviet Union Sergey Fyodorovich Akhromeyev
Physicist Anatoly Petrovich Alexandrov
Marshal of the Soviet Union Petr Kirillovich Koshevoi
Army General Yakov Grigorevich Kreizer

See also 
Awards and decorations of the Soviet Union
Volgograd
Hero City

References

External links 
 Legal Library of the USSR

Soviet campaign medals
Military awards and decorations of the Soviet Union
1942 establishments in the Soviet Union
Awards established in 1942
Battle of Stalingrad